The 1990 Swedish motorcycle Grand Prix was the twelfth round of the 1990 Grand Prix motorcycle racing season. It took place on the weekend of 10–12 August 1990 at the Anderstorp.

500 cc race report
Last year, Wayne Rainey lost any chance at the championship by crashing on this track, and this year he has a points advantage on Kevin Schwantz, but a DNF would just about erase the lead. He’s asked:
Q: “Is this going to be one of the occasions when you go for points rather than a win?”
WR: “Well, I’m going to go for both; it’s going to be tough tomorrow for those guys that have been going fast—if they go the same speed tomorrow; so we’re just going to ride around, have some fun and collect all the points we can get.”
Q: “You’ll be satisfied then if you don’t win?”
WR: “No.”

At the light, Rainey gets the start and is followed by Eddie Lawson, Mick Doohan, Randy Mamola, Carl Fogarty and Wayne Gardner. Schwantz is behind with another bad start.

Schwantz soon moves into fourth place, but then crashes out and ends much hope for the championship.

The race develops into two pairs: Rainey and Lawson on the Yamahas, then a small gap to the Hondas of Doohan and Gardner. Will Lawson stay behind Rainey and help him out as he said he would earlier in the season?

Gardner leaves Doohan and shows Lawson a wheel, but Lawson keeps Gardner under control for the moment. Ron Haslam crashes and runs off the track just as the leaders zoom in.

Gardner isn’t able to match Rainey and Lawson’s pace and finishes in third, and Lawson’s second place may have been deliberate in order to help teammate Rainey.

500 cc classification

References

Swedish motorcycle Grand Prix
Swedish
Motorcycle Grand Prix